The Blue Cross-Blue Shield Building is an office building in Chicago, Illinois. The building is located at 55 W Wacker Drive in the Loop in Downtown Chicago. It was designed in a Brutalist style by C.F. Murphy Associates. The building opened in 1968 as the headquarters for BlueCross BlueShield of Illinois. Foreign tenants of this Building includes the Taipei Economic and Cultural Office in Chicago (TECO-Chicago), the consular post of Taiwan in Illinois.

References

External links
 Emporis entry

1968 in Illinois
Buildings and structures completed in 1968
Office buildings in Chicago
Central Chicago
Brutalist architecture in Illinois